Pavel Horák may refer to:

 Pavel Horák (choirmaster) (born 1967), Czech choirmaster
 Pavel Horák (handballer) (born 1982), Czech handball player